Pyrbaum is a municipality  in the district of Neumarkt in Bavaria in Germany.

References

Neumarkt (district)